Vasvi Ennanovich Abduraimov (born 18 October 1954) is the chairman of New Milliy Fırqa. As a strong opponent of the Mejlis, supporter of the 2014 annexation of the peninsula, and critic of the post-Euromaidan Ukrainian government, he is universally considered to be part of the pro-Russia faction in Crimea; however, his staunch opposition to the controversial "Crimean Rose" Russian settlement project, demolitions of Crimean Tatar houses, certain bans on rallies, and other measures against the Crimean Tatars has been a subject of disagreement with others in the Russian government.

References

Crimean Tatar politicians
People of the annexation of Crimea by the Russian Federation
Living people
1954 births
Recipients of the Medal of the Order "For Merit to the Fatherland" I class